This is a list of the mayors of the Nicosia Municipality and their years of service.

Pre-Independence (1882–1959)
 Christodoulos Severis, 15 November 1882 – 31 July 1888.
 Achilleas Liassides, 1 August 1888 – 10 April 1906.
 Antonios Theodotou, 8 January 1888 – 10 April 1906.
 Mehmet Şevket Bey, 11 April 1908 – 31 March 1911.
 Antonios Theodotou, 1924–26
 George Markides, 6 April 1926 – 31 March 1929.
 Themistoclis Dervis, 5 April 1929 – 28 September 1946.
 Ioannis Clerides, 1 June 1946 – 31 May 1949 (last elected Mayor until 1986).
 Themistoclis Dervis, 1 June 1949 – 18 December 1959.

Post-Independence (1959–74)
 Diomedes Skettos, 1959–60.
 George M. Spanos, 1960–62; 1963–64.
 Odysseas Ioannides, 1964–70.
 Lellos Demetriades, December 1971 – July 1974 (dismissed by the July 15 Coup)

After 1974
 Christoforos Kithreotis, August 1974
 Lellos Demetriades, October 1974 – 2001 (Elected in 1986; reelected in 1991 and 1996)
 Michael Zampelas, 2002–06
 Eleni Mavrou, 2007–11
 Constantinos Yiorkadjis, 2011–present.

See also 
 List of mayors of Nicosia Turkish Municipality

Lists of mayors